Jackson Township is an inactive township in Johnson County, in the U.S. state of Missouri.

Jackson Township was established in 1835, taking its name from President Andrew Jackson.

References

Townships in Missouri
Townships in Johnson County, Missouri